Inalcanzable may refer to:

 "Inalcanzable" (song), a 2007 song by RBD
 Inalcanzable (album), a 1993 album by Los Bukis